David William Catlin (born 12 May 1952 Rochester, Pennsylvania) is an American mathematician who works on the theory of several complex variables.

Catlin received in 1978 his Ph.D. from Princeton University under Joseph Kohn with thesis Boundary Behavior of Holomorphic Functions on Weakly Pseudoconvex Domains. He is a professor at Purdue University.

Catlin was an Invited Speaker with talk Regularity of solutions of the -Neumann problem at the ICM in 1986 in Berkeley. In 1989 he received the inaugural Stefan Bergman Prize.

His brother Paul Allen Catlin (1948–1995) also achieved fame as a mathematician, doing research on graph theory.

Selected publications
Necessary conditions for subellipticity of the -Neumann problem, Annals of Mathematics, 117, 1983, 147–171 
Boundary invariants of pseudoconvex domains, Annals of Mathematics 120, 1984, 529–586 
Subelliptic estimates for the -Neumann problem on pseudoconvex domains, Annals of Mathematics, 126, 1987,  131–191 
Estimates of invariant metrics on pseudoconvex domains of dimension two, Mathematische Zeitschrift 200, 1989, 429–466 
as editor with Thomas Bloom, John P. D'Angelo, Yum-Tong Siu: Modern methods in complex analysis, Annals of Mathematics Studies 137, Princeton University Press 1995 (dedicated to Robert Gunning and Joseph Kohn)
with J. P. D'Angelo: A stabilization theorem for Hermitian forms and applications to holomorphic mappings, arXiv preprint math/9511201, 1995
Global regularity of the -Neumann problem, in: Complex analysis of several variables, Proc. Symp. Pure Math. Vol. 41, AMS, 1984, 39–49
Necessary conditions for subellipticity and hypoellipticity for the -Neumann problem on pseudoconvex domains, in: Recent Developments in Several Complex Variables (John E. Fornæss, ed.), Annals of Mathematics Studies Vol. 100, 2016, 93–100.

References

External links
David W. Catlin, Mathematics Departrment, Purdue University

20th-century American mathematicians
21st-century American mathematicians
Complex analysts
PDE theorists
Princeton University alumni
Purdue University
1952 births
People from Rochester, Pennsylvania
Living people